Yura may refer to:

Place 
 Yura, Wakayama, a town in Japan
 Yura District, a district in Peru
 Yura Station, a railway station in Japan

Ethnic groups and languages 
Yura, or Adnyamathanha, an indigenous group of South Australia
Yura, or Eora, an indigenous group of New South Wales, Australia
Yura, or Yuracaré people, a Bolivian indigenous group
Yura, or Yuracaré language, a language of Bolivia
Yura languages, a language group of Australia

People with the name 

Yura Kim, an alternative name of Kim Jong-il, the leader of North Korea
Yura (South Korean singer) (born 1992), South Korean singer and member of Girl's Day
Yura Halim (1923–2016), Bruneian politician
Yura Matsuda (born 1998), Japanese figure skater
Yura Min (born 1995), South Korean ice dancer 
Yura Movsisyan (born 1987), Armenian soccer player
Yura Yunita (born 1991), Indonesian jazz singer
Hiroaki Yura (born 1981), Japanese violinist
Hnat Yura (1888–1966), Soviet and Ukrainian director, actor of theatre and film, pedagogue

Characters 
 Yura Sakuratsuki, from the anime series Futakoi

Other uses 
 Japanese cruiser Yura, a 1922 cruiser of the Imperial Japanese Navy
 Yura Asaf, a religious figure of multiple religions
 Diminutive form of Slavic given name Yury

See also 
 Iura (disambiguation)
 Jura (disambiguation)